P.D. Women's College, established in 1950 and also known as Prasannadeb Women's College, is general degree women's college in Jalpaiguri, West Bengal, India. This is not only one of the oldest women's college in Jalpaiguri district but also in North Bengal. It offers undergraduate courses in arts and science. It is affiliated to the University of North Bengal.

Departments

Science

Mathematics
Physics
Chemistry
Zoology
Botany

Arts

Bengali
English
Sanskrit
History
Geography
Political science
Philosophy
Education
Economics
Computer Science

Accreditation

P.D. Women's College is recognized by the University Grants Commission (UGC).

See also

References

External links
P.D. Women's College
University of North Bengal
University Grants Commission
National Assessment and Accreditation Council

Colleges affiliated to University of North Bengal
Educational institutions established in 1950
Women's universities and colleges in West Bengal
Universities and colleges in Jalpaiguri district
1950 establishments in West Bengal